5L or 5-L can refer to:

Transportation
 AeroSur (IATA code)
 5L, a model of Toyota L engine
 Curtiss F-5L, see Felixstowe F5L
 SSH 5L (WA), former name of U.S. Route 12 in Washington
 Atlantic coast F-5L, see Felixstowe F.5
 Auster J/5L, a model of Auster Aiglet Trainer
 British Rail Class 202 Diesel-electric multiple units (6L) when reduced to a five-carriage configuration
 British Rail Class 203 Diesel-electric multiple units (6B) when reduced to a five-carriage configuration by the removal of their buffet cars

Science and technology
 ORC5L
 TAF5L
 5L, a model of HP LaserJet 5
 AIX 5L, see IBM AIX

Other uses
 The Horns of Nimon (production code: 5L), a 1979–80 Doctor Who serial

See also
 L5 (disambiguation)